Orange County Fair Speedway is a  dirt oval speedway in Middletown, Orange County, New York.  The facility holds weekly stock car races and demolition derbies during the summer months.  The track was built in 1857 for horse racing at the Orange County Fair and staged its first automobile race on August 16, 1919.  The fair began as an agricultural exhibit in 1843 and was permanently located in the Wallkill–Middletown area in 1857. The speedway is located at 239 Wisner Avenue in Middletown on land which was known as The Ogden Tract in the mid-1850s.  It was originally a half-mile horse racing track known as the Harry Clay Oval, named after a race horse that was famous at that time.  Over the years, the track was widened and lengthened to a true 5/8-mile race track.

History 
In 1913, the Orange County Fair Society director, George Martin, who was an auto racing enthusiast, brought the idea of replacing the horses with automobiles to the board of directors but his proposition was denied for six straight years.  Martin's idea was vetoed by the board but he was stubborn and he argued, talked and persisted until he finally convinced the board of directors to at least try it in 1919. The race was witnessed by 5,000 in attendance and was won by James Benedict driving a Benedict Special powered by a Deusenberg motor. 1924 saw the track resurfaced with clay from a nearby pond, which was found to be soft enough for the horse races that still occasionally took place on the track yet tacky and stable enough for auto racing. This "hard clay" allowed for the track to gain a reputation for its speed that persists to this day.

Auto racing continued at the speedway each year until the beginning of World War II when motorsports nationwide was suspended due to shortages of gasoline, iron, steel, rubber and aluminum.  Weekly stock car racing began on April 16, 1950 and has continued every week since that time.
In 1946, after World War II ended, the Harry Clay Oval was renamed Victory Speedway, Inc and saw the return of ARDC Midget racing.  Stock car racing officially began at the speedway on September 18, 1948 as Rocky Dinatale is credited with the first-ever stock car win.  The first fully contested championship season began on April 16, 1950 and the first race of the season was won by Tex Enright driving # 407 Modified coupe.  Enright would later go on to be one of the most popular flagmen in dirt track auto racing.

Today, the Orange County Fair Speedway still operates on a weekly basis from April to September.  Nicknamed "The House of Power", the Orange County Fair Speedway boasts a long history of dirt track auto racing where many legendary northeast dirt track drivers have tested the boundaries of the hard clay.  The speedway has been home to many dirt track modified drivers such as Frankie Schneider, Ray Brown, Will Cagle and Buzzie Reutimann and drivers of today are still testing their limits on the 5/8-mile track; like Brett Hearn, Rich Eurich, Danny Johnson and Jerry Higbie.

In addition to auto racing, the facility will begin a new era of motocross racing on a race track built in 2013 outside of turns 3 and 4.

On November 26, 2014 speedway owner Mike Gurda announced that in 2015 the speedway will run as an independent track and end its sanction with DIRTcar NorthEast.

Eastern States Weekend 
The track also hosts the annual Eastern States Weekend, where dirt Modified, 358- Modified, and Sportsman drivers race their cars in 200 (modified), 150 (358s), and 50 lap races. The weekend usually falls in mid-October. This is the end of the racing season for most regulars at the track.

The Eastern States 200 Modified race is the oldest consecutively-run championship event for dirt track Modified stock cars in the United States.

The first race was run on October 28, 1962 and was won by Frankie Schneider of Lambertville, New Jersey.

In 1968 the annual 100-lap event was increased to 200 laps.  The all-time track champion at Orange County Fair Speedway, Brett Hearn has won the Eastern States 200 a record 12 times since 1979.

Eastern States 200 Winners 
(As of 2022)

Weekly events 
Auto races are every Saturday night from April through September and features a variety of stock car divisions including Big Block Modifieds, Small Block Modifieds, Sportsman, Rookie Sportsman, Street Stocks, Thunder Trucks, CRSA Sprints, Slingshots and hosts an annual World of Outlaws Late Model race.

In addition to weekly auto racing, the Orange County Fair Speedway has built a brand new motocross track on the grounds which made its inaugural debut in 2014 with six dates of racing.

List of track champions 
Stock car championships have been contested at the Orange County Fair Speedway consecutively since 1950 when the first Modified championship was won by Russ Dodd of Middletown.

References

External links 
 
 Victory Speedway History

Stock car racing
 
Dirt track racing
Dirt oval race tracks in the United States
Motorsport venues in New York (state)
Sports venues in Orange County, New York
1857 establishments in New York (state)
Sports venues completed in 1857
Defunct horse racing venues in New York (state)